Christopher Mark Cumberland (born January 15, 1973) is a former professional baseball pitcher who played professionally from 1993 to 2004.

Cumberland was drafted by the New York Yankees in the 48th round of the 1992 Major League Baseball Draft. He played in the Yankees' minor league system from 1993 until 1997. He played for several organizations after leaving the Yankees including the Minnesota Twins, Boston Red Sox, San Francisco Giants, Atlanta Braves, Toronto Blue Jays. San Diego Padres, and Kansas City Royals. He also played in Japan for the Hiroshima Toyo Carp in the Central League in 2000 and the Long Island Ducks of the Atlantic League in 2002.

External links

Nippon Professional Baseball career statistics from Baseball-Reference

1976 births
Living people
American expatriate baseball players in Japan
Nippon Professional Baseball pitchers
Hiroshima Toyo Carp players
Long Island Ducks players
Omaha Royals players
Portland Beavers players
Fort Worth Cats players
Tennessee Smokies players
Syracuse SkyChiefs players
Greenville Braves players
Richmond Braves players
Fresno Grizzlies players
Pawtucket Red Sox players
Trenton Thunder players
New Britain Rock Cats players
Salt Lake Buzz players
Norwich Navigators players
Columbus Clippers players
Gulf Coast Yankees players
Tampa Yankees players
Greensboro Bats players
Oneonta Yankees players